Sambir Raion is a raion in Lviv Oblast in western Ukraine. Its administrative center is Sambir. Population: . It was established in 1965.

On 18 July 2020, as part of the administrative reform of Ukraine, the number of raions of Lviv Oblast was reduced to seven, and the area of Sambir Raion was significantly expanded. Two abolished raions, Staryi Sambir and Turka Raions, as well as the city of Sambir, which was previously incorporated as a city of oblast significance and did not belong to the raion, were merged into Sambir Raion. The January 2020 estimate of the raion population was

Subdivisions

Current
After the reform in July 2020, the raion consisted of 11 hromadas:
 Biskovychi rural hromada with the administration in the selo of Biskovychi, retained from Sambir Raion;
 Borynia settlement hromada with the administration in the urban-type settlement of Borynia, transferred from Turka Raion;
 Dobromyl urban hromada with the administration in the city of Dobromyl, transferred from Staryi Sambir Raion;
 Khyriv urban hromada with the administration in the city of Khyriv, transferred from Staryi Sambir Raion;
 Novyi Kalyniv urban hromada with the administration in the city of Novyi Kalyniv, retained from Sambir Raion;
 Ralivka rural hromada with the administration in the selo of Ralivka, retained from Sambir Raion;
 Rudky urban hromada with the administration in the city of Rudky, retained from Sambir Raion.
 Sambir urban hromada, transferred from the city of oblast significance of Sambir;
 Staryi Sambir urban hromada with the administration in the city of Staryi Sambir, transferred from Staryi Sambir Raion;
 Strilky rural hromada with the administration in the selo of Strilky, transferred from Staryi Sambir Raion;
 Turka urban hromada with the administration in the city of Turka, transferred from Turka Raion.

Before 2020

Before the 2020 reform, the raion consisted of four hromadas, 
 Biskovychi rural hromada with the administration in Biskovychi;
 Novyi Kalyniv urban hromada with the administration in Novyi Kalyniv;
 Ralivka rural hromada with the administration in Ralivka;
 Rudky urban hromada with the administration in Rudky.

Settlements in Sambir Raion

Sambir Raion consists of 2 city communities, 1 settlement community, 7 rural communities and 9 village councils, which unite 110 settlements and are subordinate to the Sambir district council. The administrative center is the city of Sambir, which is a city of regional importance and is not part of the district.

United territorial communities of Sambir district:

Babynska village community
Biskovytska rural community
Vilshanytska village community
Vole-Baranetska rural community
Voiutytska village community
Dublianska settlement community
Lukivska village community
Novokalynivska city community
Rudkivska city community
Chukvianska rural community

Villages:

Berestiany
Biskovychi
Chukva
Hordynia
Kalyniv
Kornalovychi
Kulchytsi
Lanovychi

People from Sambir Raion 
 Petro Konashevych-Sahaidachny (1570-1622) — a Ukrainian political and civic leader, Hetman of Ukrainian Zaporozhian Cossacks
 Marko Zhmaylo-Kulchytskyy — Registered Cossacks Hetman (1625), leader of the peasant-Cossack Zhmaylo Uprising in 1625.
 Yuriy Frants Kulchytsky (1640-1694) — Ukrainian political and civic leader.
 Omeljan Pritsak (1919-2006) — Ukrainian-American historian, first Mykhailo Hrushevsky Professor of Ukrainian History at Harvard University and the founder and first director (1973–1989) of the Harvard Ukrainian Research Institute.

See also
 Administrative divisions of Lviv Oblast

References

 
Raions of Lviv Oblast
1965 establishments in Ukraine